Gerry Dee (born Gerard Francis-John Donoghue; December 31, 1968) is a Canadian actor, stand-up comedian, game show host, director, producer, and writer. He is currently the host of Family Feud Canada. He placed third on the fifth season of Last Comic Standing, and he wrote and starred in the sitcom Mr. D, which aired on CBC  Television.

Early life
Dee was born Gerard Francis-John Donoghue, and is of Irish and Scottish descent. He was born in Scarborough and raised in Toronto. He was a university varsity hockey player and golfer. He attended St. Gabriel's (Bayview/Sheppard) and De La Salle College, Oaklands, where he later worked as a physical education teacher and hockey coach. He studied kinesiology and athletic therapy at York University and education at St. Francis Xavier University. His father was a bus driver for the TTC in Toronto for over 20 years.

Career
Dee was relatively successful long before being on Last Comic Standing. He had already had his own comedy special on The Comedy Network in Canada, appeared on the Comedy Network special "The Nubian Disciples", and performed at the world-famous Montreal Just for Laughs International Comedy Festival, having his segment aired on Just For Laughs. He has appeared in television commercials and has performed at many comedy clubs, including Just For Laughs and Yuk Yuks. Dee also had a role in the 2006 film Trailer Park Boys: The Movie, where he played the role of Donny. That same year, Dee played former Boston Bruins player Wayne Cashman in the CBC miniseries Canada Russia '72.

Dee placed third on the fifth season of Last Comic Standing. He had tried out for Last Comic Standing during the second and fourth seasons, but never advanced to the finals. He missed the birth of his daughter while appearing on the show. Since late 2007, Dee has had his own segment on Canadian cable channel The Score. These segments, entitled Gerry Dee: Sports Reporter, have Dee conducting humorous interviews and segments. The interviews have included such sports personalities as Charles Barkley, Michael Jordan, Wayne Gretzky, Cito Gaston, Randy Couture, and Chris Bosh.

Dee appeared in television commercials for Rogers, Wisers, KFC, and Nissan, and is currently making guest appearances on CBC's The Hour. He won a 2008 Canadian Comedy Award in the Best Male Stand-Up comic category.

In January 2012, his sitcom Mr. D premiered on CBC Television. Created, written by and starring Dee, the show is based on his experience as a high-school teacher. Dee’s children, Alyce, Faith, and Breton Donoghue, are also a part of the cast. Alyce played "Amanda-Susan" as well as some background characters, Faith played "Faith" as well as some background characters, and Breton played "John".

On July 8, 2019, it was announced that Dee would be the host of Family Feud Canada.

Publishing career
In October 2012, Doubleday Canada published Dee's Teaching: It's Harder Than It Looks. Like Dee's sitcom Mr. D, Teaching is based on his ten years as a teacher. A national bestseller, the book came out in paperback in May 2013.

Personal life
Dee is the son of Scottish immigrant parents. He is a former high school physical education teacher. He was the first Canadian ever to win the prestigious San Francisco Comedy Competition. He played varsity hockey at St Francis Xavier University in Antigonish, Nova Scotia. Dee and his wife Heather have two daughters Alyce and Faith, as well as one son, Breton. His daughters played recurring roles on his comedy show Mr. D as Amanda-Susan (Alyce) and Faith (Faith), while his son appeared in the series finale as John. Gerry is a supporter of Celtic Football Club.

Filmography

Film

Television

References

External links
"Gerry Dee Sports Reporter" page on TheScore.com
 

1968 births
Living people
21st-century Canadian comedians
21st-century Canadian male actors
Best Actor in a Comedy Series Canadian Screen Award winners
Canadian Comedy Award winners
Canadian game show hosts
Canadian male comedians
Canadian male film actors
Canadian male television actors
Canadian people of Irish descent
Canadian people of Scottish descent
Canadian stand-up comedians
Canadian television sportscasters
Comedians from Toronto
Last Comic Standing contestants
Male actors from Toronto
People from Scarborough, Toronto
St. Francis Xavier University alumni
St. Francis Xavier X-Men ice hockey players
York University alumni